Tropical Park Stadium is a 7,000-seat stadium located in Olympia Heights, Florida, a CDP near Miami, Florida, United States. The stadium is located in Tropical Park and is the home field of Miami Dade FC and FC Miami City.
Also, many local high-school football teams use it as their home field. It was also former home Miami FC of USL First Division.

The multi-purpose stadium features an athletics track, and a grass field used for soccer, American football, rugby, and other various sports.

Tropical Park hosted matches during the 2006 CONCACAF Women's Gold Cup.

References

Fort Lauderdale Strikers stadiums
Soccer venues in Florida
High school football venues in the United States
Multi-purpose stadiums in the United States
Sports venues in Miami-Dade County, Florida